Raiza Goulão (born February 28, 1991) is a Brazilian cross-country cyclist. She placed 20th in the women's cross-country race at the 2016 Summer Olympics.

References

1991 births
Living people
Brazilian female cyclists
Brazilian mountain bikers
Olympic cyclists of Brazil
Cyclists at the 2016 Summer Olympics
Cyclists at the 2015 Pan American Games
South American Games silver medalists for Brazil
South American Games medalists in cycling
Competitors at the 2014 South American Games
Pan American Games competitors for Brazil
21st-century Brazilian women
Competitors at the 2022 South American Games